A bachelor party (in the United States and sometimes in Canada), also known as a stag weekend, stag do or stag party (in the United Kingdom, Commonwealth countries, and Ireland), or a buck's night (in Australia), is a party held/arranged by the man who is shortly to enter marriage.
  
A stag night is usually planned by the groom's friends or family.

The first references to Western stag nights in the Oxford English Dictionary date to the 19th century. Traditionally, stag nights involved a black tie banquet hosted by the father of the groom that included a toast in honour of the groom and bride. Since the 1980s, some bachelor parties in the United States have involved vacationing to a foreign destination, or have featured female company such as strippers or topless waitresses.

History
The bachelor party dates back as early as the 5th century B.C. The ancient Spartans celebrated the groom's last night as a single man in which they held a dinner and made toasts on his behalf.

In 1896, Herbert Barnum Seeley, a grandson of P. T. Barnum, threw a stag party (known as the "Awful Seeley Dinner") for his brother at restaurant Sherry's in New York City. The party had a dancer, nicknamed "Little Egypt", who allegedly danced naked in desserts. The party was dissolved in the early morning by an officer. Afterwards, the Seeley family brought the police officer to the police board trial for "conduct unbecoming to an officer of the law." At that time, that incident brought the light to the "behind closed doors" matters with bachelor parties.

The term "bachelor", originally meaning "a young knight-in-training", was first mentioned in the 14th century to refer to an unmarried man in Geoffrey Chaucer's The Canterbury Tales. In 1922, the term "bachelor party" was published in William Chambers's Journal of Literature, Science and Arts and was described as a "jolly old" party.

Variations
The equivalent event for the bride-to-be is known as a bachelorette party (or hen night).

In Canada, some choose instead to hold a stag and doe, or a hag party or hag do in the UK ("hag" being a combination of the words "hen" and "stag"), in which both the bride and groom attend. These events may often provide an opportunity to fundraise for the wedding itself.

Canada
Canadian stag nights may extend into weekend affairs, sometimes involving travel to a cottage or cities around Canada, and occasionally Las Vegas as well. As in South Africa, the itinerary of a stag event is frequently kept hidden from the groom-to-be. The Australian terminology 'buck' rather than 'stag' is sometimes used.

In the province of Manitoba particularly, a "social" is often held rather than a stag and doe, in which the public are invited to attend a large evening party at a rented pub or event venue. Tickets are sold at the door or online, there is usually a cash bar and silent auction, and a traditional buffet of regional snack foods known as a 'midnight lunch' will be served throughout the evening.

France
In France and in many French-speaking regions such as Quebec, the bachelor party is called , which literally means "(the) burial of the life as a boy" or "burial/funeral of the life as a bachelor". Bachelor parties were known as early as the 1830s, when in the Charpennes neighborhood of Lyon groups of young men would dine at the restaurant of La Mere Brigousse on her famous dish of enormous dumplings les tétons de Vénus (Venus's breasts).

Germany
In Germany, this event is called Junggesellenabschied, which literally means "bachelor farewell". There is also a separate event that the couple celebrates together on the evening prior to their wedding, called Polterabend. At the Polterabend, the guests break old porcelain and earthenware to bring luck to the couple's marriage. The tradition is said to go back to pre-Christian times; by noisily breaking ceramics, evil spirits – especially spirits of envy – are supposed to be driven out. In the last couple of years, Anglo-style bachelor parties have become more and more popular among bachelors. In parts of northern Germany that lack a Carnival tradition, funny costuming has become a popular part of bachelor or bachelorette parties.

Some parts of Germany have a related custom, in which a person who is not yet married by their 30th birthday, is made to dress up in an embarrassing fashion by their friends and to do silly tasks that most often include some kind of cleaning work.

Israel
In Israel, the bachelors party is called  (mesibat ravakim), literally meaning bachelor party. Such parties may feature heavy drinking and sometimes the presence of strippers, or else other recreational bonding activities undertaken together, such as paintball or an overseas trip lasting a few days.

South Africa
Bachelor parties in South Africa are expected to be a surprise, which is a unique regional variant. The party is planned without the groom's knowledge and is typically a couple days before the wedding. A bachelor party can include many family members and friends, and it isn't limited to the wedding party. It often includes a traditional braai.

Sweden 
In Sweden bachelor parties are known as Svensexa. They are documented since 17th century, and it is believed the tradition began with the bachelorette party, Möhippa, before followed by a male version. The parties were first called Svenafton, meaning Sven's Eve. Sven is a Swedish first name, meaning "young man" and also used in connection with male virginity. The parties were disliked by the church as they involved heavy drinking and the participants would show up hangover or drunk at service. In the 19th century it was reformed by the bourgeoisie, and it became known as Svensexa, where sexa was a new word for a late night party with dinner and alcohol, that started six o'clock with drinks and snacks. There were no activities at Swedish bachelor parties, other than food and alcohol, until the 1960s or 1970s. Since then they have developed to full day, or weekend events, traditionally starting with a kidnapping followed by activities that may involve humiliation of the bachelor. They are usually not held the day before the wedding, but a few weekends before.

Thailand 
Bachelor parties in Thailand became increasingly popular after huge success of The Hangover 2 Movie which was filmed and based in Bangkok.

United Kingdom and Ireland
Pranks are a long-standing feature of stag parties in the UK and Ireland. The press reported in 1964 that Howard Newham (21), of Park Road, Timperley, Cheshire, Greater Manchester, required firefighters to saw off a 'ball and chain' from his leg. He told reporters: "My friends padlocked it on my bachelor party and they said they had lost the key".

In the United Kingdom, it is now common for the party to last for more than one evening, hence the increasing prevalence of the phrase "stag weekend", or "stag do". A spin-off has been the growth of the stag weekend industry in the UK with various companies taking over the preparation of the event.

In the UK, stag weekend trips are becoming mini-holidays with the groups taking part in various day-time activities as well as the expected night out on the town. They may involve travelling to another location in the UK or going abroad, with Kraków, Dublin, and Riga topping the list, followed by Prague, Amsterdam, Bratislava, and Budapest. Stag parties abroad have been known to involve visits to brothels and prostitutes, although this is in the minority of cases.

United States
In the United States, Las Vegas is both a popular bachelor party destination and location for the wedding itself. Increasingly, "destination bachelor parties" are replacing standard nights out, with Americans traveling to Las Vegas, Miami, Nashville, or Mexico.

Bachelor parties in the US stereotypically entail the mass consumption of alcohol, hiring a stripper, and general rowdiness to which the bride might not have a positive reaction; in fact, the defining feature of the bachelor party is that the fiancée is not present. Increasingly, bachelor parties have come to symbolize the last time when the groom is free from the influence of his new wife/partner. Pop out cakes are sometimes associated.

See also

 Bridal shower
 STAG: A Test of Love, a reality television show about bachelor parties
 Bachelor Party, a 1984 film
 Very Bad Things, a 1998 film
 Budapest, a 2018 film

References

Men's spaces
Parties
Pre-wedding
Rites of passage
Sex industry